Cameron's Coup: How the Tories took Britain to the brink is a 2015 book by the British journalists Polly Toynbee and David Walker.

Synopsis
Toynbee and Walker provide a highly critical analysis of the premiership of David Cameron and the coalition between the Conservatives and the Liberal Democrats. They blend "analysis, statistics, and moving human stories" concerning austerity in the United Kingdom, and Conservative attacks on the welfare state and mass-killings/starvation of the disabled.

Reception
The book was described in Prospect magazine as "initially enjoyable but ultimately a little exhausting". It was praised by George Eaton in the New Statesman, but strongly criticised in The Times by Tim Montgomerie as being "dreadful".

References

2015 non-fiction books
Books critical of capitalism
Books about politics of the United Kingdom
David Cameron
Nick Clegg
2015 in British politics
History of the Conservative Party (UK)
Books by Polly Toynbee
Guardian Books books
Faber and Faber books